Garrett Ford may refer to:

 Garrett Ford Sr. (born 1945), athletics administrator at West Virginia University and former All-American tailback
 Garrett Ford Jr. (born 1970), former West Virginia tailback, son of the above
 William L. Crawford (1911–1984), American publisher and editor, used the pseudonym Garret Ford

See also
 Garrett Fort (1900–1945), American short story writer, playwright, and Hollywood screenwriter